MM Platinum (commonly known as La Masia) is a South African football club based in Westbury, Johannesburg that plays in the National First Division.

They gained promotion to the 2022–23 National First Division after winning the 2021–22 SAFA Second Division, winning Gauteng Stream B as well as the playoffs, defeating Magesi in the final.

Honours
SAFA Second Division
2021–22 SAFA Second Division

References 

Soccer in South Africa